Nowa Karczma  is a village in the administrative district of Gmina Siekierczyn, within Lubań County, Lower Silesian Voivodeship, in south-western Poland. Prior to 1945 it was in Germany.

Near Nowa Karczma, there is an FM/TV-broadcasting facility, using a 134 metres tall guyed steel tube mast.

References

Nowa Karczma